Clarence River may refer to:

 Clarence River (New South Wales), in northern New South Wales, Australia 
 Clarence River (Tasmania), in southern Tasmania, Australia
 Clarence River (Alaska–Yukon), rises in the Yukon Territory of Canada and crosses the border several times into the U.S. state of Alaska
 Waiau Toa / Clarence River, on the South Island of New Zealand
 Clarence (river), a tributary of the Lys in northern France